"Some Girls" is a song written by Michael Hardy, C.J. Solar, and Jake Mitchell, and recorded by American country music singer Jameson Rodgers. It was released on September 8, 2017, as Rodgers' debut single, and lead single from both his second self-titled EP (2018) and debut studio album Bet You're from a Small Town (2021). It was sent to country radio on June 3, 2019, and went on to top the Billboard Country Airplay chart on the week of October 31, 2020.

Content
Rodgers originally included "Some Girls" in 2018 on a self-titled independent EP prior to signing with Columbia Records Nashville and River House Entertainment. Hardy wrote the song with Jake Mitchell and C. J. Solar. The three writers had originally conceived the song as a demo before any of them had any success as songwriters. When no other artist recorded the song, Rodgers chose to record it himself.

Billy Dukes of Taste of Country wrote that the song is a "made-for-mainstream single that packs the words in heavy early on, but then relies on the repeated chorus to get to the end."

Charts

Weekly charts

Year-end charts

Certifications

References

2020 debut singles
2020 songs
Columbia Nashville Records singles
Jameson Rodgers songs
Songs written by Hardy (singer)
Song recordings produced by Chris Farren (country musician)
Songs written by C.J. Solar
2020 singles